The Chinese Language Teachers Association (CLTA), founded in 1962, is an American teachers' association devoted to promote the teaching and study of Chinese language and culture. It publishes the Journal of the Chinese Language Teachers Association (JCLTA), a leading scientific journal in the field of Chinese linguistics, didactics, and literature. Articles are available on the CLTA's website after subscription, and in paper form in subscribing libraries. The journal Chinese as a Second Language (CSL) is a continuation of JCLTA that publishes peer-reviewed original articles in English or Chinese (simplified of traditional characters) that make significant contributions to the theory and/or practice of Chinese as a second language. CTLA-US members receive CSL's publications, or readers must subscribe to the Journal.

References

External links
 
 http://www.sudoc.abes.fr/DB=2.1/SET=1/TTL=2/CLK?IKT=1016&TRM=Journal+of+the+Chinese+Language+Teachers+Association
 http://clta-us.org/history/

Language teacher associations